Bucky F*cking Dent is a 2016 novel by actor David Duchovny which focuses on a father-son relationship and baseball.

Plot
A Yankee Stadium peanut vendor moves in with his father, a lifelong Boston Red Sox fan, who is fighting off cancer long enough in hopes of seeing the Red Sox beat the Yankees in the 1978 playoffs.

Reception 
The novel received generally favorable reviews.  Joseph Salvatore in the New York Times stated, "Duchovny hits an unexpected home run." Micah Pollac, in the Washington Post, noted, "Duchovny’s tone makes the ride a pleasure. He dips into the waters of love, death, fatherhood, marriage and sex, but he doesn’t go too deep. You enjoy the swim without becoming a prune."

References

2016 American novels
Baseball novels
Farrar, Straus and Giroux books